The 1947 Kilkenny Senior Hurling Championship was the 53rd staging of the Kilkenny Senior Hurling Championship since its establishment by the Kilkenny County Board.

On 24 August 1947, Éire Óg won the championship after a 3-10 to 0-13 defeat of Tullaroan in the final. It was their fourth championship title overall and their first title in two championship seasons.

Results

Final

References

Kilkenny Senior Hurling Championship
Kilkenny Senior Hurling Championship